The 2022 Giro di Sicilia (known as Il Giro di Sicilia EOLO for sponsorship reasons) was the 26th edition of the Giro di Sicilia road cycling stage race and the third edition since its revival in 2019.

Teams 
Three of the 19 UCI WorldTeams, four UCI ProTeams, eleven UCI Continental teams and one national team made up the 19 teams that participated in the race.

UCI WorldTeams

 
 
 

UCI ProTeams

 
 
 
 

UCI Continental Teams

 
 
 
 
 
 
 
 
 
 
 

National Team
 Italy

Route

Stages

Stage 1 
12 April 2022— Milazzo to Bagheria,

Stage 2 
13 April 2022 — Palma di Montechiaro to Caltanissetta,

Stage 3 
14 April 2022 — Realmonte to Piazza Armerina,

Stage 4 
15 April 2022 — Ragalna to Mount Etna,

Classification leadership table

Final classification standings

General classification

Points classification

Mountains classification

Young rider classification

Team classification

References

External links 
 

2022 UCI Europe Tour
2022 in Italian sport
April 2022 sports events in Italy